Marin Roglić (born 16 June 1997) is a Croatian footballer who most recently played for SV Eltendorf.

Career
Marin Roglić started his youth career in HNK Hajduk Split before moving to RNK Split youth setup at the age of 12, and featured in the team that won the Croatian U19 title in the 2014–15 season. He made his debut for RNK Split in the 2014–15 season against Dinamo Zagreb in a game which ended 0–0. He was called up to the Croatia national under-19 football team by Zoran Vulić. He received a runners up medal in the Croatian Football Cup with RNK Split in 2014–15 when they lost on penalties against Dinamo Zagreb. He was sent on loan to the third division team Junak Sinj until the end of the season. He rejoined the RNK Split senior team the following summer and continued to play in the Prva HNL.

On 8 January 2020, Roglić joined Austrian club SV Eltendorf.

References

External links
 
 Austrian career stats - ÖFB

1997 births
Living people
Footballers from Split, Croatia
Association football wingers
Croatian footballers
Croatia youth international footballers
RNK Split players
NK Junak Sinj players
NK Radomlje players
NK Vinogradar players
NK Lučko players
Slovenian Second League players
Croatian Football League players
First Football League (Croatia) players
Austrian Landesliga players
Croatian expatriate footballers
Croatian expatriate sportspeople in Slovenia
Expatriate footballers in Slovenia
Croatian expatriate sportspeople in Austria
Expatriate footballers in Austria